"If You Don't Want My Love" is a song by Robert John (aka Ben Rochinski) from 1968. It became a hit in the U.S. (Billboard #49, Cash Box #34) and the UK (#42).  It did best in Canada, where it reached #21.

The song was written and performed with Michael Gately, as was the B-side of the single, "Don't".

"If You Don't Want My Love" was the first charting hit of John's adult career.  At age 12 he had previously had a minor hit in 1958 with "White Bucks and Saddle Shoes" under his given name, Bobby Pedrick Jr.

Chart history

References

External links
 Lyrics of this song
 

1968 songs
1968 singles
Robert John songs
Columbia Records singles